Sitric may refer to:

Sigtrygg, an Old Norse given name, or Sitric in Norse-Gaelic Ireland (9th to 11th centuries)
Sitric Cáech (died 927), a Viking leader and ruler
Sitric II of Northumbria (fl. c. 942), a Viking leader

See also
Sitrick and Company
Citric acid